The Night of the Storm or Tempestuous Love is a 1957 West German drama film directed by Falk Harnack and starring Lilli Palmer, Ivan Desny and Willy A. Kleinau.

It was made at the Spandau Studios in Berlin with sets designed by Ernst Schomer and Hans Jürgen Kiebach. Location shooting took place in Munich and Messina in Italy.

Cast
 Lilli Palmer as Marianne Eichler
 Ivan Desny as Viktor Ledin
 Willy A. Kleinau as Friedrich Eichler
 Susanne Cramer as Gina
 Siegfried Schürenberg as Herterich
 Käthe Braun as Beate Hoberg
 Peter Capell as Dr. Baumgarten
 Karl Hellmer
 Hans Hessling
 Ralph Lothar as Kuelz
  as Prokurist Wechsler
 Arthur Schröder as Richter
 Alexa von Porembsky as Emmy
 Peter Uwe Witt as Horst
 Konrad Wagner as Dr. Brandes

References

Bibliography 
 Bock, Hans-Michael & Bergfelder, Tim. The Concise CineGraph. Encyclopedia of German Cinema. Berghahn Books, 2009.

External links 
 

1957 films
West German films
German drama films
1957 drama films
1950s German-language films
Films directed by Falk Harnack
Films based on German novels
Adultery in films
Films about fictional painters
Films shot at Spandau Studios
1950s German films